Kotri–Attock Railway Line (also referred to Main Line 2 or ML-2) is one of four main railway lines in Pakistan, operated and maintained by Pakistan Railways. The line begins from Kotri Junction and ends at Attock City Junction. There are 73 railway stations from Kotri Junction to Attock City Junction on this line.

History

The present-day Kotri–Attock Railway Line was built as a patchwork of different railways during the 19th and 20th centuries by North Western State Railway and Pakistan Railways. The present day line consists of the following historic lines:

Mari–Attock Railway
The Mari–Attock Railway opened in 1891 as a  broad gauge railway line between Mari Indus and Attock. In 1895 it was extended to Mianwali.

Jacobabad–Kashmore Railway
The Jacobabad–Kashmore Railway (also known as the Upper Sind Light Railway) opened in 1914 as a  narrow gauge railway line between Jacobabad and Kashmore.

Larkana–Jacobabad Light Railway
The Larkana–Jacobabad Light Railway (also known as the Sind Light Railway) opened in 1924 as a  narrow gauge railway line between Larkana and Jacobabad.

In 1956, Pakistan Western Railway converted the all 3 sections from  narrow gauge to  broad gauge. Between 1969 and 1973, Pakistan Western Railways completed the gap section between Kashmore–Mari Indus and the line was also extended from Larkana to Kotri, thus linking Kotri to Attock. In 2010, this line was designated Main Line 2 by Pakistan Railways to provide an alternative North–South route to the heavily used Karachi–Peshawar Railway Line.

Stations
The stations on this line are as follows:

See also
 Karachi–Peshawar Railway Line
 Railway lines in Pakistan

References

Railway lines opened in 1891
Railway stations on Kotri–Attock Railway Line (ML 2)
5 ft 6 in gauge railways in Pakistan